Frédéric Machado (born 11 November 1975 in Sartrouville) is a French professional football player. Currently, he plays in the Championnat de France amateur for Gap FC.

He played on the professional level in Ligue 1 for Lille OSC and in Ligue 2 for Lille OSC, ASOA Valence, AS Beauvais Oise and Besançon RC.

1975 births
Living people
French footballers
Ligue 1 players
Ligue 2 players
Lille OSC players
ASOA Valence players
AS Beauvais Oise players
Racing Besançon players
Gap HAFC players
Association football forwards
People from Sartrouville